Tulizma is a rural locality (a selo) in Shovkrinsky Selsoviet, Laksky District, Republic of Dagestan, Russia. The population was 67 as of 2010.

Geography 
Tulizma is located 6 km south of Kumukh (the district's administrative centre) by road, on the left bank of the Kazikumukhskoye Koysu River. Khurkhi and Shara are the nearest rural localities.

Nationalities 
Laks live there.

References 

Rural localities in Laksky District